Robertas Dargis (born 9 August 1960 in Irkutsk, Russia) was the President of Lithuanian Confederation of Industrialists (LPK) from 2012 to 2020. He is currently the President of Lithuanian Real Estate Development Association and Chairman of the Board and the owner of JSC Eika.

Career 
 2012–present President of Lithuanian Confederation of Industrialists. 
 2004–present President of Lithuanian Real Estate Development Association
 1993–present Chairman of the Board, “Eika” - one of the largest real estate development companies in Lithuania. 
 2001-2002 Chancellor of the Government of Lithuania
 1992-1993 Deputy Director, conglomerate "Monolitas" (VĮ “Ekspo”). Residential and industrial construction
 1987-1992 VĮ “Aras” foreman, head of ground works, director of commerce. 
 1979-1983 Construction manager of Kruonis power plant

Education 
 1978-1983 Vilnius Institute of Civil Engineering. Building Engineer
 1978 Mažeikiai 3d secondary school.

Social activities 
 2006 - until now Member of Presidium in the Lithuanian Builders Association 
 2006-2010 Member of committee of "Lithuanian National Prize for Progress" project
 2007-2008 Head of the Working Group to prepare the Lithuanian land system conversion guidelines
 2006-2008 Supernumerary Counselor of Lithuania`s Prime Minister
 2000-2007 Member of the Board in the Institute of Civil Society 
 2003-2004 Lecturer in Vilnius Gediminas Technical University.
 2001-2003 Supernumerary Counselor of the President of Lithuania
 1999-2000 Consultant to the Government of the Republic of Lithuania on municipal housing issues

 Coauthor of textbook "Sustainable Real Estate Development" 
 Publisher of textbook "Sailing” by A. Dovydenas 
 One of initiators of “Amber sail” project
 Constant sponsor of "Vilnius Jazz" festival
 Member of the Board of Trustees in Institute of International Relations and Political Science
 Author of the project “Give a vision to Lithuania”

Awards 
 In 2010. KKSD Sports Cross of Honour for the important contribution to development of sport in Lithuania
 In 2009. Petras Vileišis nomination 
 In 2009. "Sustainable Building" award for activities aimed at realization of sustainable development ideas
 In 2009. Presidential nomination Order for Merits to Lithuania. Cross of Commander
 In 2007. Olympic Star award of Lithuanian National Olympic Committee 
 In 2006. Lithuanian Honorary Boatmen Mark by Ministry of Transport and Communications 
 In 2006. Business Hall of Fame laureate
 In 2003. Presidential Decree for the Order for Merits to Lithuania. The Cross of Officer.
 Mark of Honour by Lithuanian Builders Association 
 Mark of Honour by Lithuanian Union of Engineers
 Award of Merit to Vilnius municipal government

References 

1960 births
Living people
People from Irkutsk